Yang Min (born 4 November 1994) is a Chinese rugby sevens player. She competed in the women's tournament at the 2020 Summer Olympics.

References

External links
 

1994 births
Living people
Female rugby sevens players
Olympic rugby sevens players of China
Rugby sevens players at the 2020 Summer Olympics
People from Taizhou, Jiangsu
Rugby union players at the 2014 Asian Games
Rugby union players at the 2018 Asian Games
Asian Games gold medalists for China
Asian Games silver medalists for China
Asian Games medalists in rugby union
Medalists at the 2014 Asian Games
Medalists at the 2018 Asian Games
China international women's rugby sevens players